The Choptank (or Ababco) were an Algonquian-speaking Native American people that historically lived on the Eastern Shore of Maryland on the Delmarva Peninsula. They occupied an area along the lower Choptank River basin, which included parts of present-day Talbot, Dorchester and Caroline counties.  They spoke Nanticoke, an Eastern Algonquian language closely related to Delaware. The Choptank were the only Indians on the Eastern Shore to be granted a reservation in fee simple by the English colonial government.  They retained the land until 1822, when the state of Maryland sold it, in part to pay for the state's share of the District of Columbia.

History
The name Choptank is thought to be from the Nanticoke word tshapetank: a stream that separates, or place of big current.

The Algonquian-speaking Choptank were independent, but they were related in culture and language to the Nanticoke, the larger paramount chiefdom immediately to their south, which was dominant on the Eastern Shore.  After the arrival of English colonists, the tribes' histories took different paths.  The Choptank maintained good relations with the European settlers.  Eventually they were assimilated into the mainstream society through intermarriage.  Like many other small tribes, they ceased to exist as a separate entity, although their descendants survive.

The only Indian reservation which the English established in fee simple on the Eastern Shore was the Choptank Indian Reservation in 1669.  The territory included what later became the city of Cambridge, the county seat of Dorchester County.  The last town in Dorchester County occupied by the Choptank was Locust Neck Indian Town, which they left about 1790. In 1822, the state of Maryland sold the land of the reservation for development.  The state used some of the proceeds to pay its share of contribution to the formation of the District of Columbia.

The U.S. Navy tugboat Choptank was named after the tribe.  It served from 1918 until 1946.  The towns of Choptank, Maryland, and Choptank Mills, Delaware, are named after the river. Fictional members of the tribe are characters in the early chapters of James Michener's 1978 novel, Chesapeake.

See also
 Native American tribes in Maryland

References

Eastern Algonquian peoples
Extinct Native American tribes
Indigenous peoples of the Northeastern Woodlands
Nanticoke tribe
Native American history of Maryland
Native American tribes in Maryland
Lenape
Algonquian ethnonyms